Hamadryas arinome, the turquoise cracker, is a species of cracker butterfly in the family Nymphalidae. The species was first described by Hippolyte Lucas in 1853. It is found from Mexico south to the Amazon basin.

The larvae feed on Dalechampia triphylla.

Subspecies
Hamadryas arinome arinome (French Guiana, Peru, Brazil)
Hamadryas arinome arienis (Panama, Costa Rica, Colombia)
Hamadryas arinome obnutila (Brazil)

References

Hamadryas (butterfly)
Lepidoptera of French Guiana
Lepidoptera of Brazil
Nymphalidae of South America
Butterflies described in 1853